The Paneuropean Working Group in the European Parliament was established in 1985 by Otto von Habsburg. It aims at bringing Members of the European Parliament together, who follow the vision and principles of Richard von Coudenhove-Kalergi. Already after the end of the First World War, he formulated his thoughts about a common Europe in freedom, rule of law and peace.

Since 2009, the Austrian Member of the European Parliament, Paul Rübig is the elected President of the Working Group, after he had served already several years as Vice-President. Previous presidents were Nicolas Estgen, Leo Tindemans (1994-1999) and Ingo Friedrich (1999–2009).

Activities

Once a month, every Tuesday during the Strasbourg plenary week of the European Parliament, the Working Group invites high-ranking personalities from politics, business, religions and culture into the European Parliament. The group wants to encourage networking between the Members of the European Parliament, in order to establish open debates and to find common solutions for the problems of a common in a globalized world. Additionally, the group also organizes also events in Brussels.

References 

European Parliament
Richard von Coudenhove-Kalergi